Leptostales virgota is a moth of the  family Geometridae. It is native to the Caribbean, primarily found on Puerto Rico and Jamaica.

References

Moths described in 1901
Sterrhinae